Norfolk Island competed in the 2014 Commonwealth Games in Glasgow, Scotland from 23 July to 3 August 2014. 24 athletes in four sports will represent the country.

Badminton

Individual

Doubles

Mixed team

Pool E

Lawn bowls

Men

Women

Shooting

Men

Women

Squash

Two squash athletes are representing the island.

Doubles

See also
Sport in Norfolk Island

References

External links

Norfolk Island at the Commonwealth Games
Nations at the 2014 Commonwealth Games
2014 in Norfolk Island
2014 in Australian sport